Ludwig Gustav Wilhelm Scheuermann (18 October 1859, Burgersdorp - 1 September 1911, Herrsching am Ammersee) was a German painter and caricaturist.

Biography 
He was born to a family of merchants from Augsburg. Shortly before his birth, they had emigrated to South Africa to start a new business. His father died only two years later, and they returned to Augsburg, where he had his primary schooling.

At the age of twenty, he enrolled in the classics course at the Academy of Fine Arts Munich. There, he studied with Gyula Benczúr, Ludwig von Löfftz and Alexander Strähuber. After graduating, with support from his teachers, he was able to spend some time in Paris at the Académie Julian, where he worked with William Bouguereau.

After some travelling in Italy and North Africa, he returned to Germany and, in 1887, married Désirée Stolberg; a Baltic-German from Riga. By this time, he was a successful painter of rural genre scenes and, in 1888, was able to acquire property Herrsching am Ammersee. Later, he was able to build a large villa on the lakeshore, with a design inspired by Italian palaces. Every summer his friends would visit and they would have modest art festivals.

In 1905, he and Desirée were divorced and she was given custody of their two children. After his death, at the age of fifty-two, his villa was inherited by his son, who held it until 1934, when it was passed to the community. It has since become headquarters for the Herrsching Adult Education Center and an occasional site for art exhibits.

References

Further reading 
 Hyacinth Holland, Biographisches Jahrbuch und Deutscher Nekrolog, Vol.16, Georg Reimer, Berlin Online

External links 

1859 births
1911 deaths
19th-century German painters
19th-century German male artists
German genre painters
German caricaturists
Académie Julian
People from Burgersdorp
20th-century German painters
20th-century German male artists